The Bill Goodwin Show is an old-time radio situation comedy in the United States. It was broadcast on CBS April 26, 1947 – December 13, 1947. In October 1947, the program's name was changed to Leave It To Bill.

Format
The Bill Goodwin Show centered around "a hotshot insurance salesman" who was "an eager-beaver civic-improvement volunteer, with genius for landing behind eight-balls."

Personnel
Bill Goodwin, usually known as an announcer, became an actor to star in this program. Other regulars heard on the program and their roles are indicated in the table below.

Source: On the Air: The Encyclopedia of Old-Time Radio 

Larry Burns was the director and producer.

1957 program
Goodwin had another radio program a decade later. The 55-minute Bill Goodwin Show was broadcast on NBC radio beginning March 25, 1957. It was carried by 95 of the network's affiliates and sponsored by Schick razors.

References 

1947 radio programme debuts
1947 radio programme endings
CBS Radio programs